New Drobo is a populated place in the Jaman South District of the Bono Region of Ghana, adjacent to the town of Japekrom.

References

Populated places in the Bono Region